Asheqan (also Romanized as ‘Āsheqān) is a village in Tus Rural District, in the Central District of Mashhad County, Razavi Khorasan Province, Iran. At the 2006 census, its population was 15, in 4 families.

See also 

 List of cities, towns and villages in Razavi Khorasan Province

References 

Populated places in Mashhad County